The Softball Federation of Pakistan (SFP) is the governing body to develop and promote the sport of softball in Pakistan.
The SFP organizes and conducts national championship annually for men and women's, senior, junior level. The federation also organizes zonal championships and provides technical training at Provincial and District level.

Affiliations
The Federation is affiliated with: 
 International Softball Federation  
 Softball Confederation of Asia 
 Pakistan Olympic Association
 Pakistan Sports Board

References

External links
 Official Website

Sports governing bodies in Pakistan
Softball organizations
Softball in Pakistan